The 2018 Portsmouth City Council election took place on Thursday 3 May 2018 to elect members of Portsmouth City Council.

14 of 42 seats were contested during this elections within the unitary authority.

After this year's local elections, the composition of the council is now (compared to the situation immediately prior to the election):

The Statement of Persons Nominated was made on 6 April 2018 by Returning Officer David Williams.

Following the elections, a Liberal Democrat minority administration was formed, with the support of Labour. This replaced the previous Conservative minority administration that had governed since 2014.

Ward results

Baffins

Central Southsea

Charles Dickens

1: After nominations were closed, Udy resigned from the Labour Party citing a lack of support from the local party while under investigation by the National Executive Committee.
2: Godier's share compared to his performance under UKIP label in 2014.

Copnor

Cosham

Drayton and Farlington

Eastney and Craneswater

Fratton

Hilsea

Milton

Nelson

Paulsgrove

St Jude

St Thomas

References

2018 English local elections
2016
2010s in Hampshire